Alfons Mieczysław Chrostowski, also Mieczysław Alfons Chrostowski, was a Polish author, playwright, and editor of Polish language newspapers in the United States.
Karen Majewski wrote, in Traitors and True Poles, that Chrostowski is an exemplar of an alternative Polish collective identity based on social class in preference to ethnic group or nationality.

Biography 
Chrostowski was born in Russian Poland of a noble Polish Family.

He was a self-proclaimed active member of the Russian Nihilist movement.
He was educated in Moscow, where he was involved in revolutionary circles and joined the Black Hand Society.
He was wounded in an attack on a government newspaper office which resulted in his expulsion under a police guard.
He was sent back home by the government.
He escaped or emigrated to the United States before 1887.

He was a member of Ognisko, a New York group of immigrant radical leftist journalists and social activists.

"While he played a role in the establishment of Immaculate Heart of Mary Church," Charles Kaczynski wrote, in Polish American Studies, that "Chrostowski became a pivotal character in the establishment of the American Catholic Church." In 1894, a national convention of seceding Polish Roman Catholics, according to The New York Times, organized "a new church society, under the adopted name of American Catholic Church" in which "the separate churches comprising the society are to control and possess their own property" and feature "free seats and parochial schools".
During the convention, Archbishop Joseph René Vilatte "was appointed the ecclesiastical head of the new church" but he was "to be without arbitrary powers" and subordinate bishops would be elected.
Chrostowski proposed a motion "that all allegiance to the Pope of Rome be renounced, but after a warm discussion this motion was not carried." After announcing plans to hold its second convention, according to Kaczynski, "the American Catholic Church seemingly disappeared from the historical record."

Majewski wrote that "all traces of him seem to disappear within Polonia by early 1900s"; except, in 1915, he was arrested "on a warrant charging him with being deranged" based on letters he wrote to President Woodrow Wilson and his Cabinet and was held for observation at Bellevue Hospital Center, and according to Majewski, he is listed in 1920 United States Census as a 48-year-old playwright.

Works or publications

His play  (Nihilists) was performed by workers' theater groups in the United States and banned in New York City at insistence of Russian consul.

It about the Pervomartovtsy, members of the Russian left-wing terrorist organization Narodnaya Volya, and their successful assassination of Tsar Alexander II of Russia with a bomb on March 13, 1881. According to Karol Estreicher, the play was banned because of rumors that a "live dynamite bomb was supposed to be set off".

Other creative works 

 Serialized in 

Chrostowski wrote other revolutionary works that were published anonymously in European periodicals, according to Majewski.

Newspapers 
Chrostowski was editor of the following Polish language newspapers:

Notes and references

Notes

References

19th-century Polish dramatists and playwrights
19th-century Polish male writers
Polish male dramatists and playwrights
Polish editors